In human mitochondrial genetics, haplogroup E is a human mitochondrial DNA (mtDNA) haplogroup typical for the Malay Archipelago. It is a subgroup of haplogroup M9.

Origin

Two contrasting proposals have been made for the location and time of the origin of Haplogroup E.
One view is that the clade was formed over 30,000 years ago, around the time of the Last Glacial Maximum, on the northeast coast of Sundaland (near modern Borneo).
In this model, the haplogroup was dispersed by rising sea levels during the Late Glacial period.

In 2014, the mitochondrial DNA of an 8,000-year-old skeleton found on Liang Island, one of the Matsu Islands off the southeast China coast, was found to belong to Haplogroup E, with two of the four mutations characteristic of the E1 subgroup.
From this, Ko and colleagues argue that Haplogroup E arose 8,000 to 11,000 years ago near the north Fujian coast, travelled to Taiwan with Neolithic settlers 6,000 years ago, and from there spread to Maritime Southeast Asia with the Austronesian language dispersal.
Soares et al caution against over-emphasizing a single sample, and maintain that a constant molecular clock implies the earlier date (and more southerly origin) remains more likely.

Distribution
Haplogroup E is found throughout Maritime Southeast Asia.
It is nearly absent from mainland East Asia, where its sister group M9a (also found in Japan) is common.
In particular, it is found among speakers of Austronesian languages, and it is rare even in Southeast Asia among members of other language families. It has been detected in populations of Taiwan, the Philippines, Indonesia, Malaysia (including Sabah of Borneo, but not the Orang Asli of peninsular Malaysia), coastal Papua New Guinea, and especially in the Chamorros of the Mariana Islands.

Of the four principal subclades, E1b and E2a are found mainly in Maritime Southeast Asia, while only E1a and E2b are also found in Taiwan.
E2b has low diversity within Taiwan, suggesting that it arrived there about 5,000 years ago.
The most common E subclade, E1a1a, has highest diversity in Taiwan, followed by the Philippines and Sulawesi.
Moreover, other branches of E1a1 are largely confined to Taiwan.

Subclades

This phylogenetic tree of haplogroup E subclades is based on the paper by Mannis van Oven and Manfred Kayser Updated comprehensive phylogenetic tree of global human mitochondrial DNA variation and subsequent published research.

E
E1
E1a
E1a1
E1a1a
E1a1a1
E1a2
E1b
E1b1
E2
E2a
E2b
E2b1
E2b2

See also

Genealogical DNA test
Genetic genealogy
Human mitochondrial genetics
Population genetics
Human mitochondrial DNA haplogroups

References

External links
General
Ian Logan's Mitochondrial DNA Site
Mannis van Oven's Phylotree
Haplogroup E

E